Rear Admiral Alan Green (born 19 December 1952)  is a retired South African Navy officer who served as Chief: Military Policy, Strategy and Planning for the South African National Defence Force from 1 Nov 2011. He retired in Dec 2012.

Military career

He was born in Cape Town and matriculated from Hottentots-Holland High School, Somerset West in 1970. He joined the navy in 1971. Alan attended the Military Academy and graduated with a Bachelor's degree in Military Science from Stellenbosch University.  

He  later commanded the Warrior class strike craft  (previously SAS Kobie Coetzee) in 1988-1999. Defence Advisor to France during 1996-1998. He completed the Joint Staff Course nr. 42 in 1999. Commander SAS Simonsberg from 1999-2002, Chief of Staff SANDF Training Command from 2002-2007 as a rear admiral. Director Military Strategy at Military Policy Strategy Planning Division from July 2007-December 2010. He was promoted to two star admiral in January 2011 and appointed as the Chief of Military Policy Strategy Planning at the Corporate Staff Division. His awards and honours include the Medal for Distinguished Conduct and Loyal Service for 40 years service.

Awards and decorations

References

South African admirals
1952 births
Living people